Aníbal Zañartu Zañartu (12 April 1847 – 1 February 1902) was a Chilean political figure. He served several times as minister and, for a brief time, as vice president in 1901. He was a member of the Liberal Party.

Early life
He was born in Concepción, the son of Miguel José de Zañartu Santa María and of Juana de Mata Zañartu. After completing his studies in his native city, he graduated as a lawyer from the Universidad de Chile on July 19, 1870. Zañartu married Amelia Iñiguez Vicuña and they had six children. He owned a carbon mine in the Dichato beach, near Tomé. Aníbal Zañartu was of Basque descent.

Career
He started his political career as plenipotentiary ambassador to Ecuador, in 1880, during the War of the Pacific. In 1882 he was elected as a deputy for San Fernando. In 1885 he was first elected as a deputy for Chillán, on August 22 was elected president of the Chamber of Deputies and, on September 3, was named Minister of Foreign Affairs and Colonization by President Domingo Santa María. On June 28, 1887 President José Manuel Balmaceda named him Minister of the Interior.

In 1888 Zañartu was elected a Senator for Concepción, and was reelected in 1894. On June 3, 1892, he was elected vice-president of the Senate. President Federico Errázuriz Echaurren named him Minister of the Interior in 1896 and again in 1901. After the death of President Errázuriz Echaurren the same year, he served as Vice President of Chile from July 12 until September 18, when the elected successor, Germán Riesco, took over. In the same election, Zañartu was elected as a Senator for Ñuble. He died soon after, in his home in Tomé, at the age of 55.

References

1847 births
1902 deaths
People from Concepción, Chile
Chilean people of Basque descent
Liberal Party (Chile, 1849) politicians
Vice presidents of Chile
Chilean Ministers of the Interior
Foreign ministers of Chile
Deputies of the XX Legislative Period of the National Congress of Chile
Deputies of the XXI Legislative Period of the National Congress of Chile
Senators of the XXII Legislative Period of the National Congress of Chile
Senators of the XXIII Legislative Period of the National Congress of Chile
Senators of the XXIV Legislative Period of the National Congress of Chile
Senators of the XXV Legislative Period of the National Congress of Chile
Senators of the XXVI Legislative Period of the National Congress of Chile
Ambassadors of Chile to Ecuador
Chilean businesspeople
University of Chile alumni